Blacknall is a surname. It may refer to:

 John Blacknall, a 16th-century mill-owner in England.
 Mary Blacknall, daughter of John Blacknall and wife of Sir Ralph Verney, 1st Baronet, of Middle Claydon.
 William Blacknall, a 16th-century mill-owner in England, great-grandfather of Mary Blacknall.
 Saeed Blacknall, an American football player for the NFL.
 Ben Blacknall, an American football player and coach also former United States Air Force Sergeant.

See also 
 Blacknall Map